The geographically close languages  of Japanese (part of the Japonic languages) and Korean (part of the Koreanic languages) share considerable similarity in typological features of their syntax and morphology while having a small number of lexical resemblances and different native scripts, although a common denominator is the presence of Chinese characters, where kanji are part of Japanese orthography, while hanja were historically used to write Korean (marginally for limited academic, legal, media, stylistic and disambiguation purposes in South Korea today, while eliminated in North Korea). Observing the said similarities and probable history of Korean influence on Japanese culture, linguists have formulated different theories proposing a genetic relationship between them, though these studies either lack conclusive evidence or were subsets of theories that have largely been discredited (like versions of the well-known Altaic hypothesis that mainly attempted to group the Turkic, Mongolian and Tungusic languages together).

There has been new research which has revived the possibility of a genealogical link, such as the Transeurasian hypothesis (a neo-Altaic proposal) by Robbeets et al, supported by computational linguistics and archaeological evidence. However, this view has been severely criticized.

Overview

Grammar
Korean and Japanese both have an agglutinative morphology in which verbs may function as prefixes and a subject–object–verb (SOV) typology. They are both topic-prominent, null-subject languages. Both languages extensively utilize turning nouns into verbs via the "to do" helper verbs (Japanese suru する; Korean hada 하다).

Vocabulary
The two languages have been thought to not share any cognates (other than loanwords), for their vocabularies do not phonetically resemble each other. 

 
There is a minority theory attributing the name of the city Nara to a loanword from Korean (see: Nara, Nara#Etymology).

Numerals
Similarities have been drawn between the four attested numerals of Goguryeo, an ancient Korean relative, and its equivalents in Old Japanese.
 

The Sillan language called the number three "mil" as well.

Note: See Jōdai Tokushu Kanazukai for information on Old Japanese subscript notation.

Writing
Both languages use, to some extent, a combination of native scripts and Chinese characters.

Korean is mostly written in the Korean featural alphabet (known as Hangul in South Korea and Chosŏn'gŭl in North Korea). The traditional hanja (Chinese characters adapted for Korean) are sometimes used in South Korea, but only for specific purposes such as to clarify homophones (especially in TV show subtitles), linguistic or historic study, artistic expression, legal documents, and newspapers. Native Korean words do not use hanja anymore. In North Korea, the hanja have been largely suppressed in an attempt to remove Chinese influence, although they are still used in some cases and the number of hanja taught in North Korean schools is greater than that of South Korean schools.

Japanese is written with a combination of kanji (Chinese characters adapted for Japanese) and kana (two writing systems representing the same sounds, composed primarily of syllables, each used for different purposes). Unlike Korean hanja, however, kanji can be used to write both Sino-Japanese words and native Japanese words.

Historically, both Korean and Japanese were written solely with Chinese characters, with the writing experiencing a gradual mutation through centuries into its modern form.

Honorifics
Both languages have similar elaborate, multilevel systems of honorifics, and furthermore both Korean and Japanese also separate the concept of honorifics from formality in speech and writing in their own ways (See Korean speech levels and Honorific speech in Japanese § Grammatical overview). They are cited as the two most elaborate honorific systems, perhaps unrivaled by any other languages. It has been argued that certain honorific words may share a common origin. Uniquely, the honorifics rely heavily on changing verb conjugations rather than only using t-v distinction or other common methods of signifying honorifics. See Korean honorifics and Japanese honorifics.

See also
Baekje language
Classification of the Japonic languages
Classification of Japonic languages#Similarities between Japanese and Koreanic languages
Japonic languages
Koreanic languages
Peninsular Japonic

References

Language comparison
Japanese language
Korean language